Anicetus Bongsu Antonius Sinaga,  (25 September 1941 – 7 November 2020) was the Indonesian Roman Catholic bishop of the Diocese of Sibolga and then Archbishop of the Archdiocese of Medan from 2009 to 2018.

Biography
Sinaga was born in Nagadolok in Simalungun Regency, Indonesia, and was ordained to the priesthood in 1969. He served as a bishop of the Roman Catholic Diocese of Sibolga, Indonesia from 1981 until 2004, when he was installed as Coadjutor Archbishop of the archdiocese Medan. He was appointed archbishop of Medan in 2009, succeeding Alfred Gonti Pius Datubara. He was a member of the Order of Friars Minor Capuchin. In addition to his life as clergy Sinaga has also written about Toba spirituality, later publishing a book expanding on his dissertation from Catholic University of Leuven titled The Toba-Batak High God: Transcendence and Immanence.

Pope Francis accepted his resignation as Archbishop of Medan on 7 December 2018.

On 20 October 2020, it was reported that Sinaga had tested positive for the COVID-19 virus. Sinaga died in hospital on 7 November 2020.

References

External links

1941 births
2020 deaths
20th-century Roman Catholic bishops in Indonesia
21st-century Roman Catholic archbishops in Indonesia
People from Simalungun Regency
Capuchin bishops
People of Batak descent
Roman Catholic writers
KU Leuven alumni
Deaths from the COVID-19 pandemic in Indonesia